Jim Duquette is an American baseball executive. He was the general manager of the New York Mets from 2003–2004, before the team replaced him with Omar Minaya.  Duquette subsequently stayed with the Mets in a front office job for a full season before moving on to the Baltimore Orioles. With the Orioles former vice president of baseball operations, where he worked under Mike Flanagan, the team's general manager. Duquette is currently a host on SiriusXM's MLB Network Radio.

Jim Duquette's tenure as the Mets' GM is largely remembered for the trade of top pitching prospect Scott Kazmir to the Tampa Bay Devil Rays for the right-handed pitcher, Victor Zambrano.  That very same day, Duquette also traded away future All-Star José Bautista.

Duquette was a standout baseball player himself at Williams College, in Williamstown, Massachusetts. Duquette's cousin, Dan Duquette also was a major league general manager with the Montreal Expos and the Boston Red Sox and was most recently the Executive Vice-President of Baseball Operations for the Baltimore Orioles. His brother, Pat Duquette is the head men's basketball coach at UMass Lowell. In 2019, the three Duquettes were among 15 athletes, five coaches and three contributors to be inducted into the inaugural Dalton CRA Athletic Hall of Fame in Dalton, Mass.

He is currently the co-host of "Power Alley" with Mike Ferrin on Sirius XM's MLB Network Radio on Sirius 209 and XM 89. He is also a columnist for The Athletic.

For the 2012 season Duquette joined WFAN as a fill-in commentator for their NY Mets radio broadcasts.

References

External links

1966 births
Living people
Baltimore Orioles executives
Houston Astros executives
New York Mets executives
Major League Baseball farm directors
Major League Baseball general managers
Williams Ephs baseball players
Place of birth missing (living people)